The Gyro-Kopp-Ters Midnight Hawk is an American autogyro, designed by Bob and Arden Kopp and produced by their company, Gyro-Kopp-Ters of Lake City, Florida.  The aircraft is supplied as a kit for amateur construction or as a complete ready-to-fly-aircraft.

Design and development
The Midnight Hawk features a single main rotor, a single-seat open cockpit with a windshield, tricycle landing gear with wheel pants and a four-cylinder, air-cooled, four-stroke,  Subaru EA-82 automotive conversion engine in pusher configuration. The engine is available with a belt reduction drive or as a direct drive version.

Standard equipment fitted includes a hydraulic pre-rotator. The propeller used is a three-bladed Powerfin composite, ground adjustable with a  diameter.

The company estimates the assembly time from the supplied kit as 60 hours.

Operational history
By November 2017 four examples had been registered in the United States with the Federal Aviation Administration.

Specifications (Midnight Hawk)

References

External links

Official photos

1990s United States sport aircraft
Homebuilt aircraft
Single-engined pusher autogyros